Gigya, Inc. is a technology company founded in Tel Aviv, Israel and headquartered in Mountain View, California with additional offices in New York, Tel Aviv, London, Paris, Hamburg, and Sydney.

Offering  
Gigya offers a customer identity management platform for managing profiles, preference, opt-in and consent settings. Gigya's technology is used by many corporations including Fox, Forbes, Repsol, Toyota, RTL Netherlands, Campbells, Fairfax Media, Wacom, ASOS, and Turner according to the company's website. Gigya offers an identity management platform for businesses which includes products for customized registration, social login, user profile and preference management, user engagement and loyalty, and integrations with third-party marketing and services platforms.

History

Gigya was founded in Tel Aviv, Israel in 2006. Patrick Salyer became CEO in March 2011. Gigya has worked with SAP Hybris since 2013. As of November 2014, Gigya had raised $104M from Intel Capital, Benchmark Capital, Mayfield Fund, First Round Capital, Advance Publications (parent company of Condé Nast), DAG Ventures, Common Fund Capital, Vintage Investment Partners, and Greenspring Associates. Software maker Adobe Systems is also an investor. In a 2017 press release, Gigya was named leader in "The Forrester Wave: Customer Identity And Access Management, Q2 2017."

In September 2017, the company was acquired by SAP for $350 million. In October 2017, Gigya Introduced enterprise preference manager to address new privacy regulations.

2014 hacking incident 
On 27 November 2014, the Syrian Electronic Army hijacked the gigya.com domain by changing its DNS configuration at the domain registrar directly, outside of Gigya's system and control. Shortly after the incident, the CEO of Gigya, Patrick Salyer confirmed the news officially on Gigya's blog stating that no data was compromised, and that the issue had been resolved within an hour of Gigya identifying the issue. The next day, on 28 November 2014, the Syrian Electronic Army issued a statement taking responsibility for the attack.

See also
Economy of Israel
Science and technology in Israel

References

External links 
 

Identity management
Marketing companies of the United States
Password authentication
Computer access control
Software industry
Cloud computing providers
Cloud applications
Software companies of Israel
Software companies based in California
Israeli companies established in 2006
Defunct software companies of the United States
2006 establishments in Israel
Software companies established in 2006
Companies established in 2006